The Self Transcendence 24 Hour Track Race London (popularly known as the Tooting 24) is an Ultramarathon race in London, England. The run takes place annually in September, organised by the Sri Chinmoy Marathon Team. It is on the Tooting Bec Athletics Track, on a 400-metre track. 

The race first took place in 1989.

References

External links 

 Official website
 runandbecome.com
 d-u-v.org Statistic

1989 establishments in England
Athletics in London
Sports competitions in London
Annual events in London
Sports events founded by Sri Chinmoy
Sports festivals in the United Kingdom
September sporting events
Recurring sporting events established in 1989